BC2 may refer to:

 Battlefield: Bad Company 2, a 2010 video game
 Bliss bibliographic classification in its current revision
 Second generation backcrossed hybrids
 North American BC-2 airplane
 BC2 (classification), a Paralympic boccia classification

See also
 2 BC
 BCC (disambiguation)
 BC1
 BC-1 (disambiguation)
For BC1 hybrids, see Backcrossing